The 1949 All-Big Six Conference football team consists of American football players chosen by various organizations for All-Big Six Conference teams for the 1949 college football season.  The selectors for the 1949 season included the Associated Press (AP) and United Press (UP). Players who were the consensus first-team selection of both the AP and UP are shown in bold.

All-Big Seven selections

Backs
 Darrell Royal, Oklahoma (AP-1; UP-1 [QB]) (College Football Hall of Fame)
 George Thomas, Oklahoma (AP-1; UP-1)
 Dick Braznell, Missouri (AP-1; UP-1)
 Bill Weeks, Iowa State (AP-1)
 John Glorioso, Missouri (UP-1)

Ends
 Jim Owens, Oklahoma (AP-1; UP-1)
 Jim Doran, Iowa State (AP-1; UP-1)

Tackles
 Wade Walker, Oklahoma (AP-1; UP-1)
 Charles Toogood, Nebraska (AP-1; UP-1)

Guards
 Stanley West, Oklahoma (AP-1; UP-1)
 Dick Tomlinson, Kansas (AP-1; UP-1)

Centers
 Tom Novak, Nebraska (AP-1; UP-1)

Key
AP = Associated Press

UP = United Press

See also
 1949 College Football All-America Team

References

All-Big Six Conference football team
All-Big Eight Conference football teams